The California Corporate Disclosure Act was an act written by California Assemblyman Kevin Shelley and signed into law by California Governor Jerry Brown.  It became effective on 1 January 2003.  At the time the law went into effect, corporations doing business in California were required to submit certain disclosure statements.  The California Disclosure Act changed the substance and timing required to be filed with the California Secretary of State for all U.S. — as well as foreign — corporations that are either incorporated in California or that do business in California.

References

External links
Text of the bill, from the California Legislature

 California law